Randy "Ran-D" Wieland (18 May 1981 in ZeelandNbr) is a Dutch DJ and music producer.

Ran-D has been active in hardstyle music since 2006, when he released his first track "D-Pression" on Special Records. After his debut release, Ran-D moved on to release his music on the large Hardstyle Record Label A2 Records, which is a sub-label of Scantraxx Recordz. After releasing on A2 Records for seven years, in March 2015 and alongside Frequencerz, Adaro and B-Front, Ran-D founded the hardstyle record label Roughstate Music.

Ran-D has released a cover version of "Zombie" by The Cranberries, "Living For The Moment," "Firestarter," "Nirvana," "Suicidal Superstar" with Phuture Noize, "Band Of Brothers," and "Hurricane," which was awarded 1st place in the Q-dance Top 100 of 2018. 
 
In collaboration with Adaro, Ran-D is also part of the Hardstyle live-act Gunz For Hire which was founded in 2011. Gunz For Hire have released songs including "Bella Ciao," "Sorrow," "Bolivia," "Plata O Plomo," "No Mercy" and "Armed & Dangerous."

Ran-D has collaborated with other artists in hardstyle including Alpha2, Zatox, Zany, B-Front, Phuture Noize, Crypsis and Digital Punk. He performed at several hardstyle events, including Qlimax, Hard Bass, Defqon.1 Festival (in Australia, Netherlands and in Chile), Daydream Mexico, Decibel Outdoor Festival, Reverze, Q-BASE and The Qontinent. Furthermore, in January 2017, Ran-D was invited to host an X-Qlusive Event in collaboration with Q-Dance. It was held in the AFAS Live in Amsterdam (formerly known as the Heineken Music Hall).

Discography

References

External links 

 
 Roughstate Music
 A2 Records

1981 births
Living people
Dutch DJs
Hardstyle musicians
Electronic dance music DJs